A penumbral lunar eclipse took place on Thursday, September 25, 1969, the last of three penumbral lunar eclipses in 1969, the first being on Wednesday, April 2, and the second being on Wednesday, August 27. At maximum eclipse, 90% of the Moon's disc was partially shaded by the Earth, which caused a slight shadow gradient across its disc; this subtle effect may have been visible to careful observers. No part of the Moon was in complete shadow. The eclipse lasted 4 hours and 5 minutes overall.

Visibility
It was completely visible over Europe, Africa, Asia and Australia.

Related lunar eclipses

Lunar year series

Half-Saros cycle
A lunar eclipse will be preceded and followed by solar eclipses by 9 years and 5.5 days (a half saros). This lunar eclipse is related to two partial solar eclipses of Solar Saros 153.

Tzolkinex 
 Preceded: Lunar eclipse of August 15, 1962

 Followed: Lunar eclipse of November 6, 1976

See also
List of lunar eclipses
List of 20th-century lunar eclipses

Notes

External links

1969-09
1969 in science